Nee Soon South Single Member Constituency was a single member constituency (SMC) consisting of Yishun's Neighbourhood 8 (Khatib), part of Neighbourhood 7, near Springleaf MRT station, houses and condominiums along Kebun Baru and private residential areas along Sembawang Road (near Sembawang Army Camp). It was formed in 1988 after Nee Soon Constituency was split up into several SMCs. It was merged into Ang Mo Kio Group Representation Constituency (GRC) in 1997.

Member of Parliament

Elections

Elections in 1990s

Elections in 1980s

See also
Nee Soon SMC
Nee Soon Central SMC
Nee Soon East SMC
Nee Soon GRC

References
1988 GE's result
1991 GE's result

Yishun
Singaporean electoral divisions